Láng Tròn  is a ward (phường) of Giá Rai town, Bạc Liêu Province in the Mekong Delta region of Vietnam.

The ward is formerly the rural commune of Phong Thạnh Đông A.

References

Populated places in Bạc Liêu province
Communes of Bạc Liêu province